Sardar Muhammad Yousaf Khan S/O Sardar Hans Khan (1939 – 1996) was a Kashmiri politician who served as the Minister of Education of Azad Kashmir in 1972 and as Minister of Development in 1974. After General Zia dissolved the AJK assembly he was elected as a state counselor. He was born in Poonch in 1939 and shifted to town of Bagh after the independence of Pakistan in 1947. He was an important member of Pakistan Peoples Party and established a strong education system in Azad Kashmir during his tenure as the Minister of Education. He earned his honours degree in political science from Gordon College, Rawalpindi and earned his law degree from Dhaka, East Pakistan (present day Bangladesh).

Entering his political career as a lawyer, Mr. Yousaf Khan kept his goal in refining and modifying the educational system of Azad Kashmir. He launched the "Mughal Education System" which offered opportunities for many young Kashmiris to go to professional colleges. Most of the schools and colleges in present-day Bagh and Abbaspur are since that time. He had a stroke during a rally in Bagh in 1989 and died in 1996.

Due to his health conditions and on the will of Benazir Bhutto Shaheed his son Sardar Amjad Yousaf contested election in 1991 from Bagh AJK. In 1996 Sardar Amjad Yousaf was appointed as the advisor to prime minister AJK. He served as the advisor till 2001 and currently he is the official representative of PPP LA-17 poonch1(Abbaspur).

1939 births
1996 deaths
Pakistan People's Party politicians
Politicians from Azad Kashmir